The enzyme feruloyl esterase (EC 3.1.1.73) catalyzes the reaction

feruloyl-polysaccharide + H2O  ferulate + polysaccharide

This enzyme belongs to the family of hydrolases, specifically those acting on carboxylic ester bonds.  The systematic name is 4-hydroxy-3-methoxycinnamoyl-sugar hydrolase. Other names in common use include ferulic acid esterase (FAE), hydroxycinnamoyl esterase, hemicellulase accessory enzyme, cinnamoyl ester hydrolase (cinnAE).

Structural studies

References

 
 
 
 
 
 
 

EC 3.1.1
Enzymes of known structure